Acer Z520 is a high-end smartphone made by Acer Inc. much slimmer than IPhone 4. Its hardware was 1.3 GHz Mediatek MT6582 quad core, 2.3 GHz dual-core NVIDIA Tegra Denver or 1.4 GHz Qualcomm Snapdragon 320 and can underclock to 1.2 GHz (for MTK Only) and the graphics was ARM Mali-400, ULP GeForce with tesselation, instant rendering and vertex array object from OpenGL ES 3.0, or else Adreno 320. For Liquid variant, it uses 1.6 GHz dual core Intel Atom with PowerVR SGX 544MP2. RAM is 1 GB and in Liquid 2 GB.

Software updates
At 2014, it would be now update to 4.4.4 Kitkat for liquid variants and uses 1.6 GHz 64-bit Quad-Core Snapdragon S4 play with Adreno 320 and original variant update to 5.0 Lollipop. Unofficial updates in 7.0 Nougat for better stability phones.

Connectivity
Acer Z520 uses 2G, 3G, and 4G-HSPA+.
The top speed in 2G was 1024 kbit/s downlink and 768 kbit/s uplink.
In 3G, the top speed was 14.2 MB/s downlink and 7.6 MB/s uplink.
In 4G-HSPA+, the top speed was 26.4 MB/s downlink and 13.2 MB/s uplink.
Bluetooth hardware is Mediatek which supports up to 50 meters and WIFI is Ralink which also supports up to 120 meters.

Liquid Z520
Mobile phones introduced in 2015
Articles with unsourced statements from November 2016